Levantina bellardi is a species of gastropod belonging to the family Helicidae.

The species is found in Cyprus.

References

Helicidae